Natalia Jaster is an American author of fantasy romance. Her debut novel, Touch, is a re-imagination of the story of Eros featuring the female goddess Love who is forced to pair up a mortal boy with whom she has fallen in love. Her second novel, Trick, was published in 2015. It is the story of the court jester Poet and the princess Briar. Both novels were turned into series, Selfish Myths and Fooling Kingdoms respectively.

In 2020, Jaster published Kiss the Fae, the first book of the Vicious Faeries series in the Dark Fables universe. Inspired by the movie Labyrinth, the story is about a girl who must survive a fae's labyrinth in order to save her sisters.

Natalia Jaster received a master's degree in Creative Writing from California State University, Northridge in 2008.

She has also been published in the Northridge Review, Sucker Literary Magazine, YARN, and Mammut Magazine.

Works

Selfish Myths Series
Touch (2014) 
Torn (2019) 
Tempt (2019) 
Transcend (2020)

Foolish Kingdoms Series
Trick (2015) 
Dare (2017) 
Lie (2018) 
Dream (2019)

Dark Fables: Vicious Faeries Series
Kiss the Fae (2020) 
Hunt the Fae (2021)
Curse the Fae (2021)

References

External links
 

Living people
American women novelists
21st-century American novelists
American young adult novelists
California State University, Northridge alumni
21st-century American women writers
Year of birth missing (living people)